Samea sylvialis is a moth in the family Crambidae. It is found in Brazil, Venezuela and Costa Rica.

Adults are cinereous brown, the wings with a slight purplish tinge. The interior and exterior lines are whitish. The forewings have dark brown orbicular and reniform marks, the latter forming a short streak, contained in a small whitish spot. The interior line on the hindwings is indistinct.

References

Moths described in 1859
Spilomelinae